Lectionary 265, designated by siglum ℓ 265 (in the Gregory-Aland numbering) is a Greek manuscript of the New Testament, on parchment. Palaeographically it has been assigned to the 10th century.
Scrivener labelled it as 171e,
Gregory by 158e. The manuscript has no complex contents.

Description 

The codex contains lessons from the Gospel of John, Matthew, and Luke (Evangelistarium),
with lacunae at the beginning.

The text is written in Greek large uncial letters, on 78 parchment leaves, in two columns per page, 20 lines per page. It is ornamented.

History 

Scrivener and Gregory dated the manuscript to the 10th century. It has been assigned by the Institute for New Testament Textual Research (INTF) to the 10th century.

It has also note "Gallicio 1624".

The manuscript was added to the list of New Testament manuscripts by Scrivener (number 171e) and Gregory (number 265e). Gregory saw the manuscript in 1886. It was described by Carlo Castellani.

The manuscript is not cited in the critical editions of the Greek New Testament (UBS3).

The codex is housed at the Biblioteca Marciana (Gr. I.45 (927)) in Venedig.

See also 

 List of New Testament lectionaries
 Biblical manuscript
 Textual criticism
 Lectionary 264

Notes and references

Bibliography 

 
 Carlo Castellani, Catalogo dei codici Greci, Venedig 1895, pp. 56–57 (number 28)

Greek New Testament lectionaries
10th-century biblical manuscripts